Sharknado: The 4th Awakens is a 2016 American made-for-television science fiction action comedy disaster film and the fourth installment in the Sharknado film series, following Sharknado, Sharknado 2: The Second One, and Sharknado 3: Oh Hell No!. The film was directed by Anthony C. Ferrante with Ian Ziering, Tara Reid, David Hasselhoff and Ryan Newman reprising their roles from the previous installments. New people joining the cast in the film include Tommy Davidson, Masiela Lusha, Imani Hakim, Cheryl Tiegs and Gary Busey. In the film, Fin Shepard and his allies, five years after the last sharknado, contend with a group of sharknado variants, such as a "cownado" and a "lightningnado".

The film premiered on Syfy in the United States on July 31, 2016. Though the film title, poster, and intro are a parody of the 2015 film Star Wars: The Force Awakens, it is not a mockbuster.

The fifth film, Sharknado 5: Global Swarming, was released on August 6, 2017.

Plot
Tech company Astro-X has used their revolutionary energy system to stabilize the atmosphere and prevent the formation of sharknadoes, using cheap, clean reactors dubbed Astro-Pods. To celebrate the five year anniversary of the eradication of sharknadoes, Astro-X founder Aston Reynolds announces that he will be hosting the grand opening of his shark-themed hotel, "Shark World", in Las Vegas.

Fin Shepard has moved to a farm in Kansas named "April's Acres," where he lives with his mother Raye and his young son Gil. Fin travels to Las Vegas with his cousin Gemini to meet up with his son Matt, who has recently returned from deployment in Iraq. When Matt and his fiancee, Gabrielle, marry and skydive from a plane, a sandstorm develops, which cannot be defused by Astro-X. It absorbs the water and sharks from a giant tank located in Reynolds' hotel, creating a sharknado that floods the streets of Las Vegas. Fin, Gemini, Gabrielle, and Matt work together to survive the storm until it retreats into the desert.

After being rescued from the moon by Astro-X, Colonel Shepard has become an employee at Astro-X, working on the development of a weaponized mech suit with the aid of his granddaughter Claudia and a scientist at Astro-X named Wilford. However, both Colonel Shepard and Claudia are unaware that Wilford has reconstructed his daughter and Fin's wife, April, into a cyborg in order to save her life, following her death at the hands of a space shuttle's debris. Wilford has also told April that Fin and their family, who believe April to be dead, were killed by the debris in order to keep her safe inside of his laboratory.

Fin, Gemini, Matt, and Gabrielle decide to take a train back to Kansas, but the Las Vegas sharknado follows them and destroys the Hoover Dam. In order to lessen the amount of casualties by the flood, Reynolds blows up the Grand Canyon. Fin and the group meet up with Reynolds at an Astro-X facility in Arizona, where Reynolds attempts to recruit Fin to his side in order to recover from the negative publicity created from Astro-X's failure to stop the Las Vegas sharknado; however, Fin rejects this offer. He and the group end up in a small town in Texas, where they acquire a set of power tools to fight off an approaching sharknado.

The sharknado strikes an oil field and ignites, becoming a flaming tornado of fire dubbed a "firenado". The firenado strikes an electric transformer and turns into a "lightningnado", which reroutes its course for Kansas. Meanwhile, April learns of her family's survival and angrily confronts her dad and escapes his lab. A sharknado touches down in Yellowstone National Park and becomes a "lavanado", while a "hailnado" touches down at Astro-X's headquarters in San Francisco, from which Colonel Shepard and Claudia flee. When their car is picked up by the storm, April rescues them and reveals she's alive, to their surprise.

At the Kansas State Line, Fin and the group acquire a red-and-white self-driving car that is a 1958 Plymouth Belvedere named Christine, which they use to travel to April's Acres. There, an approaching sharknado forces Raye and Gil into their underground bunker before the sharknado becomes a "cownado", which later merges with the lightningnado. Fin and the group arrive to fend off the sharks, during which Gabrielle is killed. Fin, Gil, Gemini, and Matt seek shelter in the farmhouse, which is carried by the sharknado to Chicago. Reynolds uses new isotopes in his Astro-Pods to destroy the lavanado and the hailnado.

Colonel Shepard obtains a newly refurbished mech suit from Wilbur and convinces Reynolds to fly him, Claudia, and April to Fin's location in Chicago. There, April rescues Fin and Gil from the wreckage, while Astro-X agents find Gemini and Matt under the rubble. On board Reynolds' jet, April reunites with her family, allowing her to meet Gil for the first time. Meanwhile, Reynolds struggles to diffuse the lightningnado due to its electricity blocking their attempts. The situation worsens when the lightningnado strikes the Perry Nuclear Power Plant in Ohio, transforming it into a deadly "nukenado" filled with radioactive sharks.

Reynolds realizes that the only way to diffuse the nukenado is to transform it back into a regular sharknado so that the Astro-Pods will work on it. He also suggests that the engines of Col. Shepard's mech suit can be used to power a device to remove the radioactivity from the storm by drawing massive amounts of water into it. Fin realizes that the only location with enough water to work is Niagara Falls, so they travel there with the nukenado on their tail. Nearing the falls, Reynolds volunteers to jump from his jet in a squirrel suit to set off the device, which will reverse the water flow upward into the nukenado and cool it.

However, the device fails to have sufficient power, and the land below Reynolds cracks, sending him off the cliff into the water below. Colonel Shepard volunteers to pilot the mech suit to complete the plan, but is swallowed by a shark before he can put it on, as is Claudia and Matt. Fin puts on the suit and flies into the storm to fight through and reach the device. He manages to use the suit's power supply to activate the device, but he is severely injured in the process. Niagara Falls is reversed into the nukenado, neutralizing its radiation and rendering it a normal sharknado. The Astro-Pods are activated, destroying the storm.

Fin becomes unconscious and falls over the cliff and is swallowed by a shark, which is promptly swallowed by three more sharks and a blue whale in quick succession. Gil uses a chainsaw to cut open the whale and sharks, revealing Colonel Shepard, Claudia, and Matt all alive. Together, they pull out an unconscious Fin, who they revive using April's power supply and two sharks as an improvised defibrillator. Suddenly, the Eiffel Tower falls from the sky. Nova, who was earlier mentioned to be vacationing in Paris, emerges from the tower, causing the Shepards to realize that the sharknado crisis may now be a global problem.

Cast

Principal cast

 Ian Ziering as Fin Shepard
 Tara Reid as April Wexler
 Tommy Davidson as Aston Reynolds
 Masiela Lusha as Gemini, Fin's cousin
 Ryan Newman as Claudia Shepard
 Cody Linley as Matt Shepard
 Imani A. Hakim as Gabrielle, Matt's newlywed wife
 Cheryl Tiegs as Raye Shepard, Fin's mother
 Gary Busey as Wilford Wexler, April's father
 David Hasselhoff as Colonel Gilbert Shepard

Supporting Cast
 Christopher Shone and Nicholas Shone as Little Gil

 Susan Anton as Betty, the Gambler 
 Cynthia Bailey as Tech Addison
 Jillian Barberie as Train Passenger
 Benjy Bronk as Chicago Reporter
 Steffanie Busey as Craven
 Duane Chapman as "Chop Top", a chainsaw dealer
 Todd Chrisley as himself
 Grayson Chrisley as himself
 Savannah Chrisley as herself
 Stacey Dash as Mayor Sandra Mansfield, of Chicago
 James Davis as Chippendale Dancer
 Jay DeMarcus as Zimmerman, Shark World Hotel Manager
 Justine Ezarik as Shatner
 Dan Farr as himself
 David Faustino as Bud, a Las Vegas gambler
 Anthony C. Ferrante as Fenwick
 Juliana Ferrante as Juliana
 Erika Girardi as Tech Frances
 Gilbert Gottfried as Ron McDonald, Today Correspondent
 Lori Greiner as herself, Home Shopping Network Guru
 Steve Guttenberg as Colton, an old friend of Fin and the owner of a car called Christine
 Gary Herbert as himself
 Brandi Glanville as Tech Whitley, an Astro-X technician
 Hayley Hasselhoff as Supervisor Mary Jane
 Taylor-Ann Hasselhoff as Pilot Shaelyn
Robert Herjavec as Supervisor Parker, Astro-X astrophysicist
 Kym Johnson as Supervisor Gwen, Astro-X astrophysicist
 Carrie Keagan as Supervisor Martindale, at Astro-X
T'Keyah Crystal Keymah as Tech Terry, at Astro-X
 Moise Latt as Alex
 Daniel Logan as Captain Fett
 Courtney Lopez as Reporter Stormy G.
 Andre Meadows as Train Conductor
 Donna Mills as Supervisor Wink
 Jeanne Miller as EMT
 Frank Mir as Jamie, Head of Security of Shark World Hotel
 Kenya Moore as Monique
 Natalie Morales as herself
 Vince Neil as himself
 Roy Nelson as Donnie, the Pararazzo
 Wayne Newton as himself
 Gena Lee Nolin as Neely Capshaw, Astro-X rocket scientist and former lifeguard
 Alexandra Paul as Stephanie Holden, Astro-X rocket scientist and former lifeguard
 Dr. Drew Pinsky as Pastor
 DeStorm Power as National Guardman
 Dolvett Quince as Mickey, the Trainer
 Mindy Robinson as Annie, the Fan
 Al Roker as himself
 Seth Rollins as Astro-X Lopez
 Stassi Schroeder as Koening, Astro-X Manager of NYC
 Paul Shaffer as himself, street musician
 Patti Stanger as Marley Craig (Reporter)
 Nathaniel Stroman as Agent Cronenberg
 Jax Taylor as National Guardsman #2
 Corey Taylor as Frankie, a security guard at the Shark World Hotel
 Diana Terranova as Salt Lake Comic Con Host
 Charles Tillman as Johnny Zucker
 Carrot Top as Driver
 Caroline Williams as "Stretch"
 Adrian Zmed as himself
 Christine as herself
 Petunia as herself 

Other notables, credited as background 
 The Chippendales

Production
The film was confirmed to follow upon Sharknado 3s premiere. Sharknado 3 concludes with a cliffhanger regarding whether or not April is killed by falling wreckage. An ad after the film promoted a Twitter campaign offering fans the chance to decide her fate with the hashtags "#AprilLives" or "#AprilDies", with the results revealed in the forthcoming Sharknado 4 which aired in July 2016. Ian Ziering, Tara Reid, Ryan Newman, and David Hasselhoff were announced to reprise their roles from previous films. New cast members include Masiela Lusha as Gemini, Fin's cousin, Cody Linley replacing Chuck Hittinger as Matt Shepard, Imani Hakim as Gabrielle, a soldier and Matt's girlfriend, Gary Busey as Wilford Wexler, April's rich father, Cheryl Tiegs as Raye Shepard, Fin's mother, Tommy Davidson as Aston Reynolds, playboy tech billionaire and Astro-X, Kenya Moore as Monique, a hotel manager working for Reynolds, Cynthia Bailey as Addison, a tech analyst, and Maya Stojan as Romy, Wilford's assistant and Anthony Rogers as Gil Shepard.

The title, poster, and opening crawl of the film is an homage to Star Wars: The Force Awakens. Sharknado: The 4th Awakens takes place in Chicago and Las Vegas.

Reception
The film received mostly negative reviews. Rotten Tomatoes reports a 14% score with an average rating of 3.4/10, based on 14 critics. The consensus reads: "Sharknado: The 4th Awakens loses the ridiculous charm of its predecessors, leaving only clumsy social commentary and monotonous schtick that's lost its bite." On Metacritic it has a score of 35% based on reviews from 7 critics, indicating "generally unfavorable reviews".

The film was watched by 2.77 million people.

Sequel

Rumors of a fifth film, to be titled Sharknado 5... Earth 0, first surfaced in October 2016. On February 2, 2017, The Asylum confirmed via their official Facebook page that the fifth film had entered production under the working title Sharknado 5, with Ian Ziering, Tara Reid and Cassie Scerbo reprising their roles as Fin, April and Nova, respectively. In Sharknado 5, Fin and his wife April travel around the world trying to save their young son who is trapped inside a sharknado. On June 1, 2017, the title was unveiled to be Sharknado 5: Global Swarming with the tagline "Make America Bait Again".  A year later, The Last Sharknado: It's About Time! was announced.

References

External links

 
 

2016 television films
2016 horror films
2010s comedy horror films
2010s science fiction comedy films
2010s disaster films
2016 independent films
2010s English-language films
2010s science fiction horror films
American comedy horror films
American science fiction comedy films
American disaster films
American science fiction horror films
American science fiction television films
American sequel films
The Asylum films
American comedy television films
Films directed by Anthony C. Ferrante
Films set in Chicago
Films set in the Las Vegas Valley
American horror television films
Films about shark attacks
Films about sharks
Niagara Falls in fiction
Sharknado films
Syfy original films
Television sequel films
Films set in 2020
Films set in the future
2010s American films
Films set in the Yellowstone National Park